2008 Denmark Open is a darts tournament, which took place in Denmark in 2008.

Results

Last 32

References

2008 in darts
2008 in Danish sport
Darts in Denmark